Apple River Airport  was located  west of Apple River, Nova Scotia, Canada.

References

Defunct airports in Nova Scotia
Transport in Cumberland County, Nova Scotia
Buildings and structures in Cumberland County, Nova Scotia